The 2022–23 FIS Alpine Ski Far East Cup is the upcoming Far East Cup season, the second international level competition in alpine skiing.

Men

Calendar

Rankings

Overall

Giant Slalom

Slalom

Women

Calendar

Rankings

Overall

Giant Slalom

Slalom

References 

2022 in alpine skiing
2023 in alpine skiing